Sofala may refer to:
Sofala, a former seaport in Mozambique
Sofala Bank, the continental shelf off the coast of Mozambique
Sofala Province, a province in Mozambique
Sofala, New South Wales, a former gold rush town in western New South Wales
1393 Sofala, a main-belt asteroid
Sofala (Drysdale), a 1947 painting by Russell Drysdale